Daisuke Sakuma (Japanese: 佐久間 大介, Hepburn: Sakuma Daisuke, born July 5, 1992) is a Japanese idol, tarento, actor, and voice actor from Tokyo, Japan. He is known a member of a group under Johnny & Associates, Snow Man.

Career 
Sakuma begins his career in entertainment world after his mom sent his CV to idol agency Johnny & Associates, in which he passed the audition in 2005. He was a member of Johnny's Junior group Mis Snow Man in 2009 that was then succeeded by Snow Man in 2012. Snow Man make its official debut in 2020. He made his debut as voice actor on the same year in anime Black Clover as Makusa North.

Personal life 
His mom is Naomi Sakurai, who was a  member of idol group CanCan. Sakuma graduated from Josai International University in 2015.

Sakuma has been said to be "anime's biggest fan in Johnny's Junior" during his pre-debut days. He's also good at acrobatic and made his own "Acrobatic Wotagei" move.

One of his trademark is his pink hair that matches his member color in Snow Man.

He has an older brother and a younger brother.

Notable works

Film 

 Hot Snow (2011) - Sōji Doi
 Shiritsu Bakaleya Koukou (2012) - Sōta Mikuni
 Kamen Teacher (2014) - Student Council Vice President
 Last Hold! (2018) - Yoshito Kuwamoto
 Shonen-tachi (2019) - Maru
 Osomatsu-san (2022) - Jyushimatsu

Television drama 

 Piece (2012) - Kōji Maruo

Anime (voice) 

 Black Clover (2020) - Makusa North
 White Snake (2021) - Yang Tianxiang
 Cardfight!! Vanguard will+dress (2022) - Michiru Hazama

Stage play 

 Cash on Delivery (2018) - Norman

References

1992 births
Living people
Johnny & Associates
Male actors from Tokyo
Singers from Tokyo
Japanese male pop singers
Japanese dance music singers
Japanese male television actors
Japanese male film actors
Japanese idols
21st-century Japanese singers
21st-century Japanese male singers
21st-century Japanese male actors